Man and Society, A Critical Examination of Some Important Social & Political Theories from Machiavelli to Marx is a 1963 book by the academic John Plamenatz.

References

1963 non-fiction books